Enchelycore kamara is a moray eel found in coral reefs in the central Pacific Ocean. It was first named by Böhlke and Böhlke in 1980, and is commonly known as the dark-spotted moray.

References

kamara
Fish described in 1980
Taxa named by James Erwin Böhlke